Crediton  is a town and civil parish in the Mid Devon district of Devon in England. It has a population of 8,304. However, the combined population of the parishes that make up the Crediton area is estimated to be 21,990.

The town is situated in the narrow vale of the River Creedy, between two steep hills and is divided into two parts, the north or old town (People's park, Queen Elizabeth's Community College etc.) and the south and east or new town. (QECC Barnfield, Saxon Close etc.)

History
The first indication of settlement at Crediton is the claim that Winfrith or Saint Boniface was born here in c. 672.

He propagated Christianity in the Frankish Empire during the 8th century and is the patron saint of both Germany and the Netherlands. In 909 a see was established here with Edwulf as the first bishop. Nine more bishops ruled here until 1050, when Leofric obtained papal permission from Pope Leo IX to transfer the seat to Exeter, a more culturally aware, larger and walled town. Since 1897 Crediton has been the seat of a suffragan bishopric in the Diocese of Exeter; from 2004 until 2012 this was Robert Evens, between 2012 and 2015 it was Nick McKinnel (who was translated to the Anglican See of Plymouth). The current bishop of Crediton is Jackie Searle, who has been the bishop since 2018.

At the Domesday survey (1086) much of the land was still uncultivated, but its prosperity increased, and in 1269 each of the twelve prebends of the collegiate church had a house and farmland within the parish. The bishops, to whom the manor belonged until the Reformation, had difficulty in enforcing their warren and other rights; in 1351 Bishop Grandisson obtained an exemplification of judgments of 1282 declaring that he had pleas of withernam, view of frankpledge, the gallows and assize of bread and ale. Two years later there was a serious riot against the increase of copyhold.

The jury of the borough are mentioned in 1275, and Crediton returned two members to parliament during the reign of Edward I, in 1306–07, though it was never afterwards represented again. A borough seal dated 1469 is extant, but the corporation is not mentioned in the grant made by Edward VI of the church to twelve principal inhabitants. The borough and manor were granted by Elizabeth I to William Killigrew in 1595, but there is no indication of town organization then or in 1630, and in the 18th century Crediton was governed by commissioners.

The wool trade was established by 1249, and the manufacture and trading of woollen cloth, especially serge, peaked in the 16th century when the town reached the height of its prosperity. In 1630 the market for kerseys was mentioned in conjunction with a saying as fine as Kirton spinning. The woollen textile trade declined after the mid 18th century.

During the English Civil War the Earl of Essex passed through the town on 20 July 1644 on his way towards Cornwall, and evidently left the town and surrounding countryside in some disarray. He was closely followed by Charles I who arrived in the town on 27 July to review the army gathered there by his nephew, Prince Maurice, before returning to Exeter for a council of war. The following Sunday, the King spent the night at Crediton and then began his expedition of "Essex-catching".

In late 1645 and early 1646 the town was used as a base by Thomas Fairfax and the New Model Army from where they marched on the Royalist forces gathering in North Devon, and to where they returned on 29 March 1646 after success both at the Battle of Torrington and in overturning the siege of Plymouth.

On Sunday 14 August 1743, a great fire started, completely destroying High Street and buildings in the "West Town". At that period of time it was the second largest fire in the country, second only to the Great Fire of London. Sixteen people lost their lives, with over 2,000 made homeless and 450 houses destroyed. Other large fires occurred in 1766, 1769 and 1772.

The town is twinned with Avranches, France.

Geography

Climate
Crediton has an oceanic climate (Köppen climate classification Cfb).

Economy

In the early 20th century shoe-making, tanning, agricultural trade, tin-plating and the manufacture of confectionery and cider had superseded the former large woollen and serge industries.

The creamery and dairy in Crediton has always been located next to the church, but to enable its product to be distributed further, the company ran a transport depot that was located in the goods yard of the railway station. Every day, a train of three or more Milk Tank Wagons would be filled from lorries, and then taken to London by either the Great Western Railway or the Southern Railway. Express Dairies sold the creamery and a similar unit in Kirkcudbright, Scotland in July 2002 to Milk Link, which both by that time produced UHT milk.  Milk Link merged with Arla Foods in 2012 but in 2013 the newly merged company sold its Crediton operations in a management buyout.  The new company, Crediton Dairy Limited,  began trading in April 2013.

Today, the town has two industrial parks at Lords Meadow and Fordton, a dairy and a small collection of units at Westward Business Park. It is the centre for shopping and business for the surrounding area, and has industries such as graphics and pharmaceuticals.

Bristow's of Devon, founded in 1932 was one of the town's main employers but was closed in 2011 after owner New McCowan's went into administration. The factory, on Lords Meadow Industrial Estate, was reopened by Crediton Confectionery which has taken over the Bristow's brand.

In 2001 the Crediton area was given priority status with regard to the government's Market and Coastal Towns Initiative, following the outbreak of foot-and-mouth disease. By 2006, of 45 projects in the plan, 18 had been completed, resolved, or begun.

Pubs include the Crediton Inn on Mill Street, the General Sir Redvers Buller (a Wetherspoon's), the Three Little Pigs, The Ship, The Mitre on High Street, the Plymouth Inn on Dean Street, The Duke of York at the Green at the top of the High Street.

Sport and leisure

Crediton has a Football Club, (a Crediton United A.F.C.), (affiliated to the FA) which fields both Men's and Women's teams in Senior and Junior competition in local leagues.

Crediton has a Rugby Club (affiliated to the RFU) which has three senior teams, one colts team and a strong girls and Junior section.

Crediton has a running club Crediton Running Network which meets at the Lords Meadow Leisure Centre

Transport

Crediton railway station was designed by Isambard Kingdom Brunel, and was opened by the Exeter and Crediton Railway on 12 May 1851. After 1 November 1865 additional London and South Western Railway trains ran through the station going towards Okehampton. It is currently the junction of the Tarka and Dartmoor lines, though the two lines run parallel until Coleford Junction. Crediton is served by all trains on the Barnstaple to  service.

The Exeter to Plymouth railway of the LSWR needs to be reopened to connect Cornwall and Plymouth to the section of line from Okehampton via Crediton and Exeter with the rest of the UK railway system on an all weather basis.  There are proposals to reopen the line from Tavistock to Bere Alston for a through service to Plymouth.

The line was closed. Network Rail began repair work  and the line reopened on 4 April 2014. In the wake of widespread disruption caused by damage to the mainline track at Dawlish by coastal storms in February 2014, Network Rail are considering reopening the Tavistock to Okehampton and Exeter section of the line as an alternative to the coastal route.

The nearest airport is at Exeter International.

Education
Queen Elizabeth's Grammar School, founded by Edward VI and refounded by Elizabeth I, is today a state-run academy, named for Queen Elizabeth I which gets good GCSE and A level results. There are two primary schools: Hayward's Primary School and Landscore Primary School. Nearby in the village of the same name is Sandford School and ten other partner primaries.

Landmarks
 The Anglican Crediton Parish Church, formerly collegiate, is a Perpendicular building with Early English and other early portions, and a central tower.
 Southeast of the town, on a ridge overlooking the river, is the country house, Downes, built about 1692 and remodelled in the 18th century. It was the birthplace of Sir Redvers Buller whose family were lords of the manor of Crediton.
 The northwest side of the town had a great wall built in 1276 and it is still partly remaining today, although now it looks no different from a normal garden wall.

Cultural references
Bernard Cornwell mentions Crediton as Cridianton in his books The Last Kingdom and The Pale Horseman. Both books are set during the reign of Alfred the Great. 

Michael Jecks' Knights Templar Mysteries are set in and around Crediton.

See also 
 Crediton railway station

References

Further reading
 Reuter, Timothy (ed.) (1980). The Greatest Englishman: Essays on St Boniface and the Church at Crediton. Exeter: Paternoster Press.

External links
 Community website

 
Towns in Devon
Towns in Mid Devon District
Former manors in Devon